Vasile Brătianu (born 13 August 1967) is a retired Romanian football defender.

International career
Brătianu made one appearance at international level for Romania on 22 September 1993 when coach Anghel Iordănescu sent him on the field in the 86th minute in order to replace Ionel Pârvu in a friendly match which ended with a 1–0 victory against Israel.

Honours
Petrolul Ianca 
Divizia C: 1986–87
Dacia Unirea Brăila 
Divizia B: 1989–90
Cupa României runner-up: 1992–93

References

1967 births
Living people
Romanian footballers
Liga I players
Liga II players
AFC Dacia Unirea Brăila players
FC Dinamo București players
FC Universitatea Cluj players
ASC Oțelul Galați players
FCV Farul Constanța players
Association football defenders
Romania international footballers
Sportspeople from Brăila